This is a list of notable Jewish American playwrights.  For other Jewish Americans, see Lists of Jewish Americans.

David Adjmi
Lynn Ahrens
Sholom Aleichem
Woody Allen (born 1935), film director, writer, actor, and comedian
Jacob M. Appel
George Axelrod
Jeff Baron
S. N. Behrman
David Belasco
Saul Bellow
Leo Birinski
Mel Brooks
Paddy Chayefsky
Betty Comden & Adolph Green
Norman Corwin
Howard Dietz
Edward Einhorn
Eve Ensler
Harvey Fierstein
Edna Ferber
Herb Gardner
Larry Gelbart
Joel Gersmann
Josh Greenfeld
Oscar Hammerstein II
Otto Harbach
Yip Harburg
Moss Hart
Ben Hecht
Lillian Hellman
Peretz Hirshbein
Israel Horovitz
George Jessel
George S. Kaufman
Sidney Kingsley
Tony Kushner
James Lapine
Arthur Laurents
H. Leivick
Alan Jay Lerner
Ira Levin
Craig Lucas
David Mamet
Donald Margulies
Arthur Miller
Cheryl Moch
Becky Mode
Itamar Moses
Clifford Odets
Carl Reiner
Elmer Rice
Morrie Ryskind
Peter Sagal
Rod Serling
Irwin Shaw
Wallace Shawn
Sidney Sheldon
Martin Sherman
Neil Simon
Isaac Bashevis Singer
Joey Soloway, playwright, television writer
Aaron Sorkin (born 1961), screenwriter, producer and playwright
Gertrude Stein
Joseph Stein
Louise Stern 
Jeffrey Sweet
Alfred Uhry
Wendy Wasserstein (1950–2006), playwright and an Andrew Dickson White Professor-at-Large at Cornell University; recipient of the Tony Award for Best Play and the Pulitzer Prize for Drama
Jerome Weidman
Franz Werfel
Norman Wexler, screenwriter of Saturday Night Fever, Joe, Serpico, Mandingo
Rory Winston, playwright, poet, comedy writer, reviewer

See also 

List of Jewish American authors
List of Jewish American poets
Multi-Ethnic Literature of the United States
Before Columbus Foundation

References

Playwrights
Jewish American
 Jewish
Jewish